Marcelo Castelo Veiga (7 October 1964 – 14 December 2020), commonly known as Marcelo Veiga, was a Brazilian professional football manager and player.

Biography
Veiga enjoyed a seven-year spell in Série A as a player, after representing Santos, Internacional, Goiás, Bahia and Portuguesa. As a manager, his career was mainly associated with Bragantino.

Veiga died on 14 December 2020, aged 56 in Bragança Paulista, after complications from COVID-19 during the COVID-19 pandemic in São Paulo. He was the manager of São Bernardo.

Honours

Player
Ferroviário
Campeonato Cearense: 1988

Manager
Bragantino
Campeonato Brasileiro Série C: 2007

Botafogo-SP
Campeonato Brasileiro Série D: 2015

References

External links
 

1964 births
2020 deaths
Footballers from São Paulo
Brazilian footballers
Brazilian football managers
Association football defenders
Campeonato Brasileiro Série A players
Campeonato Brasileiro Série A managers
Campeonato Brasileiro Série B players
Campeonato Brasileiro Série B managers
Campeonato Brasileiro Série C players
Campeonato Brasileiro Série C managers
Campeonato Brasileiro Série D managers
Esporte Clube Santo André players
Santos FC players
Sport Club Internacional players
Goiás Esporte Clube players
Esporte Clube Bahia players
Associação Portuguesa de Desportos players
Fortaleza Esporte Clube players
Joinville Esporte Clube players
Atlético Clube Goianiense players
Sociedade Esportiva Matonense players
Itumbiara Esporte Clube players
Sociedade Esportiva Matonense managers
Itumbiara Esporte Clube managers
Clube Atlético Bragantino managers
Paulista Futebol Clube managers
América Futebol Clube (RN) managers
Clube do Remo managers
Botafogo Futebol Clube (SP) managers
Associação Desportiva São Caetano managers
Guarani FC managers
Mogi Mirim Esporte Clube managers
Ferroviário Atlético Clube (CE) managers
São Bernardo Futebol Clube managers
Deaths from the COVID-19 pandemic in São Paulo (state)